Maria Isabel de Santa Rita Vás is an Indian author, playwright, theatre director and teacher. She is the founder of the Mustard Seed Art Company (an amateur theatre group from Goa) and has been associated from its inception with the Positive People (an NGO that spreads awareness on HIV/AIDS and provides support to its victims). With over 65 theatre productions under the banner of The Mustard Seed Art Company, Vás has written and directed a number of plays in English. She has primarily been an educator for more than 40 years. She is the author of Frescoes in the Womb: Six Plays from Goa. She often features as a speaker at the Goa Arts and Literature Festival (GALF).

Personal life
Hailing from Aldona, she currently resides in Dona Paula, near the state's capital, Panaji. She holds a Doctor of Philosophy (PhD) from Goa University.

Career

Teaching
Currently a guest faculty at the Department of English, Goa University, Vás lectures MA students on creative writing. Prior to this, she worked as the head of the English Department, Dhempe College of Arts and Science, Panaji, and retired after almost 40 years of service. Holding an MA degree and a PhD, she specialises in Drama, British and American Literature.

Theatre
In 1987, Vás was approached by some students outside of school to help them in producing and performing plays. The result was an amateur theatre group, The Mustard Seed Art Company. Initially, her theatre group staged plays, based on social issues, by well-known playwrights. In 1992, she wrote and produced her first own original play, A Leaf in the Wind, after getting inspired by the hardships faced by her friend, Dominic D'Souza, Goa's first AIDS patient. She then started writing her own scripts, some of which were loosely based upon her own experiences: A Harvest of Gold (based on the exploitation of farmers), Who Killed the Ministers (a play about corruption in politics), Unmask the Mask (a play about social responsibility) and Little Boxes (a story about child labour). Her play, My Name is Goa, was performed entirely in mime, and touched upon alcoholism and the culture and history of Goa. Subsequently, she and the Company won a prize for her play, Who Sits Behind My Eyes. This play was about the life of a woman living in a fishing village, and reminded the modern generation to not forget or ignore its own traditions and community. It was inspired by a Tagore poem. In 2016, she wrote a play titled All Those Pipe Dreams, which revolved around a typically Goan family who had just bought and moved into an old mansion. In 2017, the group presented Hold Up the Sky, which was a fictional dramatisation on the life of Madame Mao, the wife of Chairman Mao Zedong of the Communist Party of China (in this work of historical fiction, she found her freedom in theatre). In 2018, she wrote the group's 66th play, Famous Nobodies. In this fictional play, museum exhibits of spouses of famous personalities from history strike up a conversation. It focused on individuals like Kasturba Gandhi, Eva Braun, Marilyn Monroe and the wife of the Pulitzer Prize winner Arthur Miller.

Her Doctor of Philosophy (PhD) thesis, titled Performing Change: Theatre in the Context of Social Transformation in Three Asian Cultures in the Twentieth Century, explores theatre in China, India (specifically, West Bengal) and Sri Lanka from 1950 to 2000.

Other works
The 250th birth anniversary of Abbé Faria, the noted Goan hypnotist, was celebrated in Candolim in 2006. For this occasion, Vás made a video titled In Search of Abbé Faria and wrote a dramatization on the life of Faria, titled Kator Re Bhaji.

She knows Portuguese language, culture and its theatre and has been featured as a guest speaker on the topic of theatre in Portuguese in 20th century Goa. She translated the play No Flowers, No Wreaths written by Orlando da Costa, current Portuguese Prime Minister António Costa's late father, into English. In a ceremony, she was given the opportunity of personally presenting her translation of the work to the prime minister, who is of Goan origin.

Community work
Apart from theatre, Vás has been actively involved in community work.

Positive People
She was a close friend of the late Dominic D'Souza, Goa's first documented AIDS patient (having worked with him on Mustard Seed plays). Together, they founded Positive People — Goa's first counselling group, an NGO, to raise awareness on HIV/AIDS. The discrimination and hardship faced by Dominic because of his disease inspired her to write and produce the Company's first original play in 1992, titled, A Leaf in the Wind. The 2005 Indian film My Brother…Nikhil, directed by Onir, was based on Dominic's life.

Other ventures
In 2016, she joined a new project called "Play Fools", where artistes and theatre personalities from different backgrounds (both, linguistic and professional) came together under a common banner to learn out of each other's experience.

Works

Books
 Frescoes in the Womb: Six Plays from Goa (2012)

Plays
 A Leaf in the Wind (1992)
 A Harvest of Gold
 Who Killed the Ministers
 Unmask the Mask
 Little Boxes
 My Name is Goa
 Who Sits Behind My Eyes
 Kator Re Bhaji (2006)
 All Those Pipe Dreams (2016)
 Hold Up the Sky (2017)
 Famous Nobodies (2018)

Other works
 No Flowers, No Wreaths (by Orlando Costa, translated into English)
 In Search of Abbé Faria (2006, video)

Awards
 Goa Sudharop Fellowship (awarded by an NGO working for the betterment of Goa) in 2003
 Goa State Cultural Award for Excellence in Drama for the year 2012-13<ref
 name="ToIWorldStage">

</ref>

See also
 Goa Arts and Literature Festival (GALF)

References

External links
 Flying together with theatre  Isabel De Santa Rita Vas  TEDxPanaji
 Isabela Santa Rita Vas: How green is my theatre...

Year of birth missing (living people)
Writers from Goa
People from North Goa district
Dramatists and playwrights from Goa
Indian women novelists
20th-century Indian dramatists and playwrights
English-language writers from India
20th-century Indian women writers
21st-century Indian women writers
21st-century Indian writers
21st-century Indian dramatists and playwrights
Living people